James Henry Cecil Hozier, 2nd Baron Newlands (4 April 1851 – 5 September 1929) was a Scottish civil servant, diplomat and politician.

Biography
Hozier was the son of William Hozier, 1st Baron Newlands.

He was educated at Eton College and at Balliol College, Oxford. In 1880, he married Lady Mary Louisa Wellesley Cecil, a daughter of the 3rd Marquess of Exeter.

He served as a Third Secretary in the Diplomatic Service from 1876, as Diplomatic Secretary at the Constantinople Conference, 1876–1877, and as Private Secretary to the Marquess of Salisbury while he was Secretary of State for Foreign Affairs from 1878 to 1880 and again as Prime Minister from 1885 to 1886.

He then entered Parliament and sat as Conservative Member of Parliament for South Lanarkshire from 1886 to 1906. He was Grand Master Mason of Scotland from 1899 to 1903 and was Brigadier of the Royal Company of Archers from 1910. He received the Freedom of the City of Glasgow in 1917.

He died without issue and his title became extinct.

Footnotes

External links 
 

1851 births
1929 deaths
Hozier, James
Hozier, James
Deputy Lieutenants of Glasgow
Lord-Lieutenants of Lanarkshire
Barons in the Peerage of the United Kingdom
People educated at Eton College
Alumni of Balliol College, Oxford
Hozier, James
Hozier, James
Hozier, James
Hozier, James
UK MPs who inherited peerages
Members of the Royal Company of Archers